This is a list of Turkish television related events from 2012.

Events
9 January - The runner-up of Miss Turkey 2003 Özge Ulusoy and her partner Vitali Kozmin win the second season of Yok Böyle Dans.
19 February - Oğuz Berkay Fidan wins the first season of O Ses Türkiye.

Debuts

International
21 January –  Alcatraz (2012) (DiziMax)

Television shows

2010s
O Ses Türkiye (2011–present)
Acayip hikayeler

Ending this year

Births

Deaths

See also
2012 in Turkey

References